Roland (died 778) was a Frankish military leader in Charlemagne's service, and subject of the epic poem The Song of Roland.

Roland may also refer to:

Places
Rural Municipality of Roland, Manitoba Canada
Roland, Manitoba, a village
Roland, Arkansas, United States, a census-designated place
Roland, Indiana, United States, an unincorporated community
Roland, Iowa, United States, a city
Roland, Oklahoma, United States, a town
Roland, Tasmania, a locality in Australia
Roland, Texas, United States, an unincorporated community
Mount Roland (disambiguation)
Lake Roland (disambiguation)

Music
Roland (Lully), a 17th-century opera with music by Jean-Baptiste Lully, and a libretto by Philippe Quinault
Roland (Piccinni), an opera by Niccolò Piccinni 
"Roland", a song on the 2002 album Turn On the Bright Lights by Interpol
"Roland", a song on the 2008 album Oh No, It's Love by the Bicycles
"Roland the Headless Thompson Gunner", a 1978 song by Warren Zevon

Military
Roland, the brand name of the Luft-Fahrzeug-Gesellschaft for a series of military aircraft flown during World War I
MOWAG Roland, an armored personnel carrier
Roland missile, a short-range air defence missile system, produced by French-German company Euromissile
Roland Battalion, a German World War II unit in 1941

Businesses
Roland Aircraft, a German aircraft manufacturer
Roland Corporation, a Japanese manufacturer of electronic musical instruments, electronic equipment, and software
Roland Foods Corporation, an American food product company

People
Roland (name), a given name and family name
Roland (entertainer), Japanese host, model, TV personality and entrepreneur
Roland Van Campenhout (born 1944), Flemish blues musician, known mononymously as Roland
Madame Roland (1754–1793), French revolutionary, salonnière and writer

Fictional characters
Roland, in the 2021 book Roland in Moonlight by David Bentley Hart
Roland Burton, in the TV series Army Wives
Roland Deschain, in the Stephen King The Dark Tower novels
Roland Jackson, in the 1997 animated TV show Extreme Ghostbusters
Roland LeBay, in the Stephen King novel Christine
Roland Rat, British children's TV puppet
Roland, in the films The Matrix Reloaded and The Matrix Revolutions
Roland (game character), a video game character from the 1980s
Roland, a playable character featured in the video game Borderlands

Other uses
Roland (statue), a type of statue depicting Roland in some German towns, including:
Bremen Roland
Roland (Haldensleben)
"Roland" (The X-Files), an episode of the television series The X-Files
Safir (cycling team), a Belgian professional cycling team known as Roland between 1986 and 1988
RC Roland, a Ukrainian rugby club in Ivano-Frankivsk
Rohrbach Roland, a 1920s German airliner
Roland (train), an express train that ran in Germany, and at times also in Switzerland and Italy
Roland Institute of Technology,  Berhampur, Odisha, India

See also
Rowlan
Rowland (disambiguation)